Matthias Kröger (born 24 May 1969) is a former speedway, long track and grasstrack rider from Germany.

Career
He rode in 2002 Speedway World Cup and is a five times World Team Champion.

In 2008, he made his British league debut riding for the Somerset Rebels in the 2008 Premier League speedway season.

Results

World Longtrack Championship

Grand-Prix Years
 1997 5 app (8th) 62pts
 1998 5 app (6th) 57pts
 1999 5 app (9th) 50pts
 2001 5 app (Third) 90pts
 2001 1 app (18th) 10pts
 2002 5 app (4th) 77pts
 2003 6 app (4th) 82pts
 2004 3 app (10th) 42pts
 2005 4 app (6th) 42pts
 2006 2 app (10th) 23pts
 2007 3 app (13th) 21pts
 2008 4 app (6th) 48pts
 2009 5 app (4th) 79pts
 2010 6 app (8th) 75pts
 2011 6 app (8th) 73pts
 2012 6 app (7th) 86pts
 2013 6 app (17th) 37pts
 2014 2 app (19th) 8pts
 2016 5 app (12th) 29pts

Best Grand-Prix Results
  Bielefeld Second 2004
  Cloppenburg Second 1997
  Harsewinkel Second 2000
  Jübek Second 2000
  Mariánské Lázně Third  2009
  Marmande Second 2006
  Morizès Third  2000, 2002, 2003
  New Plymouth Third  2004
  Forus Third 2012

Team Championship
 2007  Morizès (Champion) 9/51pts (Rode with Gerd Riss, Stephan Katt, Enrico Janoschka)
 2008  Werlte (Champion) 12/55pts (Rode with Gerd Riss, Stephan Katt, Bernd Diener)
 2009  Eenrum (Champion) 16/47pts (Rode with Gerd Riss, Richard Speiser, Enrico Janoschka )
 2010  Morizès (Champion) 8/49pts (Rode with Stephan Katt, Richard Speiser, Martin Smolinski)
 2012  St Macaire (Champion) 8/49pts (Rode with Stephan Katt, Jörg Tebbe, Bernd Diener)

European Grasstrack Championship
 1989 Semi-final
 1995  Joure (6th) 13pts
 1996  St. Colomb de Lauzun (Non-Starter)
 2002  Berghaupten (7th) 9pts
 2003  La Reole (Third) 16pts
 2004 Semi-final
 2005  Schwarme (4th) 12pts
 2006  La Réole (4th) 16pts
 2007  Folkestone (6th) 15pts
 2009  Berghaupten (4th) 15pts
 2010  La Réole (14th) 6pts
 2012  Eenrum (9th) 9pts
 2013  Bielefeld (7th) 14pts
 2014  St. Macaire (Non-Starter)

References

See also 
 Germany national speedway team

1969 births
Living people
German speedway riders
Individual Speedway Long Track World Championship riders